{| class="infobox" style="width: 25em; text-align: left; font-size: 90%; vertical-align: middle;"
|+ <span style="font-size: 9pt">List of accolades received by the Predator franchise</span>
|-
| colspan=3 |

|- bgcolor=#CCCCFF
|align="center" colspan="3"|
Total number of wins and nominations
|-
|
|
|
|- bgcolor=#CCCCFF
| colspan="3" style="font-size: smaller; text-align:center;" | Footnotes
|}Predator is a science fiction/horror film franchise originally conceived by screenwriters Jim and John Thomas. Originating from a joke makings rounds around Hollywood about Rocky Balboa fighting an alien, the Thomas brothers penned a screenplay for the first film, Predator, which was acquired by 20th Century Fox and released in 1987. Since then, there have been two sequels released intermittently, including Predator 2 in 1990 and Predators in 2010. A fourth film, The Predator, was released in 2018. The franchise is about the interactions with a barbaric and technologically-advanced races called the "Predators", which hunt humans for sport.

Though the critical consensus of the Predator'' franchise has been overall mixed, the films have been met with praise for their visual effects, including an Academy Award nomination for Best Visual Effects and a number of wins and nominations for the Saturn Awards.

Predator

Predator 2

Predators

The Predator

Prey

See also 
 List of accolades received by the Alien film series

References

External links 

 
 
 
 
 

Lists of accolades by film series
Accolades
Horror film lists